Gwen Dickey (born December 1, 1953) is an American-born British singer best known as the lead singer of the R&B band Rose Royce, where she performed under the name Rose Norwalt. The group's most recognized songs include "Car Wash" and "Wishing on a Star". In 1976, their US Billboard Hot 100 number-one single "Car Wash" brought Dickey and the band acclaim and success. Dickey left the band in 1980. As success subsided in the United States, she subsequently left the US for the United Kingdom, where she remained a popular performer at the time.

Career
Born in Biloxi, Mississippi, Dickey began performing professionally at local clubs. She eventually began performing with a local venue's house band known as The Jewels. During a tour stop in Miami, Joe Harris of The Undisputed Truth noticed Dickey, after hearing her perform with The Jewels. Harris, who had been looking for a female singer to replace Brenda Evans, had Dickey flown to Los Angeles to audition for their music producer and record label CEO Norman Whitfield. After auditioning for Whitfield, Whitfield instead placed her in his newly signed group Rose Royce. Dickey was also given the stage name Rose Norwalt by Whitfield.

In September 1976, Rose Royce released their first single "Car Wash", with lead vocals performed by Dickey. The single peaked at number one on Billboards Hot 100 chart, and sold over a million copies in United States. Rose Royce's debut album Car Wash was released on September 13, 1976. It sold over two million copies worldwide and won Grammy Award for Best Score Soundtrack Album in 1977. The album's final single "I'm Going Down", which also featured lead vocals from Dickey, peaked at number 70 on the US Billboard Hot 100 and reached number ten on the R&B singles chart.

The group's second album Rose Royce II: In Full Bloom became a platinum-seller in the United States, topped the R&B albums chart, and peaked at number nine on the Billboard Top 200 Albums chart. The album spawned three successful singles: "Do Your Dance (Part 1)", "It Makes You Feel Like Dancin'", "Ooh Boy", and "Wishing on a Star". Despite the poor chart performance of "Wishing on a Star", which was led completely by Dickey, the song became an international pop hit and garnered a certified silver certification in the United Kingdom.

In August 1978, Rose Royce released their third album Rose Royce III: Strikes Again!, which was certified gold in the United States. The album spawned two top-ten R&B singles: "Love Don't Live Here Anymore" and "I'm in Love (And I Love the Feeling)". In 1979, Rose Royce released their fourth album Rose Royce IV: Rainbow Connection, the final album to feature vocals with Dickey. In April 1980, Dickey left Rose Royce to pursue a solo career after experiencing turmoil with other members of the group.

In 1993, Dickey released her debut solo album Time to Change, which spawned the single "Don't Stop". In 1994, she and KWS released a cover of Chaka Khan's song "Ain't Nobody". In 1998, Dickey sang a duet with rapper Jay-Z on a cover of Rose Royce's "Wishing on a Star", which peaked at number thirteen on the UK Singles charts. In the same year, she also provided guest vocals on the song "Flying" by Romeo for the soundtrack of the movie Albeltje.

In 2001, she headlined a musical tour called "What A Feeling" which played in major theaters throughout England. Dickey opened for James Brown at the One Grand Prix Ball in Monte Carlo and shared a bill with Meatloaf in Antwerp, Belgium for Night of the Proms to a sold-out show for three nights that same year. In 2004, Dickey performed at the Glastonbury Music Festival in England. Dickey performed once again with James Brown at Monte Carlo for Formula 1 in 2005. She did an encore performance for the Formula 1 Drivers Annual Charity Ball in 2006. She performed throughout the United Kingdom and Europe in both 2007 and 2008.

In 2010, Dickey and her former Rose Royce band members appeared in an episode of Unsung.

Personal life
In 2010, Dickey experienced a spinal cord injury in her London home, leaving her reliant on a wheelchair. As of 2022, she still performed concerts while seated on stage.

Discography
 Time to Change (1993)

References

Living people
1953 births
20th-century American singers
20th-century American women singers
21st-century American singers
21st-century American women singers
African-American Christians
African-American women singer-songwriters
American contemporary R&B singers
American dance musicians
American emigrants to England
American women pop singers
American music arrangers
American rhythm and blues singer-songwriters
American session musicians
American soul singers
Record producers from Mississippi
American women record producers
African-American record producers
Grammy Award winners
Musicians with disabilities
People from Biloxi, Mississippi
20th-century African-American women singers
21st-century African-American women singers
Singer-songwriters from Mississippi